The molecular formula C7H5IO2 may refer to:

 2-Iodobenzoic acid
 3-Iodobenzoic acid
 4-Iodobenzoic acid